The Entren Los Que Quieran Tour is an international tour by Puerto Rican group Calle 13 in support of the band's 2010 release, Entren Los Que Quieran.

Opening Acts
Villa Cariño (Concepción)
Mr. Pauer (Miami)
Matamba (La Paz)
ChocQuibTown (Barranquilla)
Humberto Pernett (Barranquilla)
B-Side Players (San Diego)

Setlist
 "Vamo’ a portarnos mal"
 "No Hay Nadie Como Tú"
 "Baile de los Pobres"
 "Digo lo que Pienso"
 "Ven y Critícame"
 "Pa'l Norte"
 "La Bala"
 "La Cumbia de los Aburridos"
 "La Perla"
 "El Hormiguero"
 "La Vuelta al Mundo"
 "Tango del Pecado"
 "Sin Exagerar"
 "Suave"
 "Chulin Culin Chunfly"
 "Muerte en Hawaii"
 "Atrévete-te-te"

Encore
"Calma Pueblo"
"Un Beso de Desayuno / La Jirafa"
"Latinoamérica"
"Fiesta de Locos"

Notes
 In Puerto Rico the songs "La Perla", "Sin Exagerar" and "Latinoamérica" were performed featuring Rubén Blades, Tego Calderón and Lucecita Benitez respectively.

Tour dates

References

2011 concert tours
2012 concert tours
Calle 13 (band)